Diplocarpon mali is a plant pathogen that causes Marssonina blotch on apple.

References

External links 
 Index Fungorum
 USDA ARS Fungal Database

Fungal tree pathogens and diseases
Apple tree diseases
Dermateaceae
Fungi described in 1903